John de Ufford (died 20 May 1349) was chancellor and head of the royal administration to Edward III as well as being appointed to the Archbishopric of Canterbury.

Early life
His family held the estate of Offord Dameys, Huntingdonshire. His brother was Andrew Offord.

Career
De Ufford was sent, along with Nicholas de Luna and Hugh Neville to Avignon in the summer of 1344 as envoys to a council held by Pope Clement VI to mediate peace during the Peace of Malestroit (January 1343 – September 1346), a breathing space for both sides during the Hundred Years War. The mediation came to naught.

De Ufford was the chancellor to Edward III, keeper of both the great seal and the privy seal. He was entrusted with the privy seal in 1342 (thus becoming Lord Privy Seal), and the great seal on 26 October 1345, which was the duty of the Lord Chancellor. He resigned the office of Lord Privy Seal after 29 September 1344, but held the office of Chancellor until his death.

De Ufford held the position of Dean of Lincoln from 1344 to 1348.

Archbishop of Canterbury

After the death of Archbishop John de Stratford, Edward chose de Ufford as Archbishop of Canterbury, though the canons of the chapter had elected Thomas Bradwardine, the king's trusted confessor, a great intellectual and diplomat. De Ufford was appointed to the see of Canterbury by papal bull dated 24 September 1348 and was granted the temporalities of the see on 14 December 1348.

Death and afterward

Any developing contention between the chapter and the king was rendered a dead issue when de Ufford, already aged and infirm, was carried off by the Black Death, before being consecrated, on 20 May 1349.

Notes

Citations

References

External links
 British History Online: Folio xxvii–xxvii b.

1349 deaths
14th-century deaths from plague (disease)
Archbishops of Canterbury
14th-century English Roman Catholic archbishops
Lord chancellors of England
Lords Privy Seal
Deans of Lincoln
Year of birth unknown
Burials at Canterbury Cathedral